John Milkovich is an American politician and attorney from the state of Louisiana. A Democrat, Milkovich represented the 38th district of the Louisiana State Senate, based in southern Shreveport, from 2016 until 2020.

Career
Milkovich was born and raised in Roundup, Montana, and went to the University of Montana. After obtaining his J.D. at the Paul M. Hebert Law Center, Milkovich worked as a judicial clerk for Fred C. Sexton Jr. of the Second Circuit Court of Appeals. Milkovich has also been an attorney at law since 1985.

Political history
Milkovich ran for Louisiana's 4th congressional district in 2002, losing in a landslide to Republican incumbent Jim McCrery.

In 2015, Milkovich announced he would run for the 38th district of the Louisiana State Senate, vacated by term-limited Republican Sherri Smith Buffington. After failing to win a majority in the first round, Milkovich defeated state representative Richie Burford in the runoff with 52% of the vote.

Milkovich was defeated in his bid for a second term in 2019 by Republican Barry Milligan, who won a majority in the first round.

Comments on vaccines
On April 29, 2019, during a vote on Senator Regina Barrow's legislation to expand a state immunization database, Milkovich caused controversy by repeating unscientific and debunked claims about vaccinations and autism. Among other things, Milkovich claimed that "tissue from aborted babies is now used in vaccines" and that "autism did not exist" when he and another senator were growing up, both of which have been repeatedly proven false. Although no lawmaker responded to Milkovich on the Senate floor, U.S. Senator Bill Cassidy, a medical doctor, later called Milkovich's comments "fake news."

References

Living people
People from Caddo Parish, Louisiana
People from Keithville, Louisiana
People from Roundup, Montana
Democratic Party Louisiana state senators
University of Montana alumni
21st-century American politicians
Year of birth missing (living people)